Lough Melvin is a lake in the northwest of the island of Ireland on the border between County Leitrim (in Ireland) and County Fermanagh (in the United Kingdom). It is internationally renowned for its unique range of plants and animals.

Ecology
The water quality was reported to be excellent  with an oligotrophic rating.  The ecology of Lough Melvin, and other Irish waterways, remain threatened by curly waterweed, zebra mussel, and freshwater clam invasive species.

Fishes and angling

Lough Melvin is one of Ireland's famous angling loughs offering the chance of spring salmon from February to May, grilse from May to July and gillaroo, sonaghan and ferox trout throughout the season. Lough Melvin is also home to an endemic species of char, the Melvin charr or Gray's charr (Salvelinus grayi).

A ghillie or boatman is strongly recommended to anglers unfamiliar with the lake.

Gillaroo trout
Lough Melvin is home to the gillaroo or Salmo stomachius, a species of trout which eats primarily snails. The name "gillaroo" is derived from the Irish language Giolla Rua, which means "Red Fellow". This is due to the fish's distinctive colouring. It has a bright buttery golden colour in its flanks with bright crimson and vermillion spots. The gillaroo feed almost exclusively on bottom living animals (snails, sedge fly larva and freshwater shrimp) with the exception of late summer when they come to the surface to feed and may be caught on the dry fly.

Sonaghan trout
The sonaghan trout (Salmo nigripinnis) is another species of salmonid unique to Lough Melvin. It can have a light brown or silvery hue with large, distinctive black spots. Its fins are dark brown or black with elongated pectorals. Sonaghan are found in areas of open, deep water, where they feed on mid-water planktonic organisms such as water fleas (Cladocera), midge (chironomid) pupae and phantom (Chaoborus) larvae. Sonaghan will be most readily located close to the surface over deep water. Fly-fishing with a team of wet flies fished in classic lough style (i.e. short, snappy casts from a boat drifting beam-on to the breeze) gives best chance of success. Sonaghan give a powerful and energetic fight out of all proportion to their size.

Ferox trout
The classic work carried out by Andrew Ferguson of Queens University on the genetics of the trout of Lough Melvin identified the ferox as a separate subspecies. The fish home to a specific spawning area and are reproductively isolated. They are also one of the oldest trout races to colonise Ireland, perhaps as old as 50,000 years. Ferox cannibalise brown trout (which returned to many of the same lakes when geological processes and climatic conditions allowed) and also prey on other fish species. The best method of capture is trolling, particularly with a Rapala type lure.

Panoramic view

See also

List of loughs in Ireland
Dollaghan

References and notes

Notes

Primary sources

Secondary sources

Melvin
Melvin
Fishing in Ireland
Melvin
Republic of Ireland–United Kingdom border